Sargant may refer to
Edmund Beale Sargant (1855–1935), British colonial administrator
Ethel Sargant (1863–1918), British botanist 
Naomi Sargant (1933–2006), British educationalist
Thomas Sargant (1905–1988), British law reformer
William Sargant (1907–1988), British psychiatrist
Alix Sargant Florence (1892–1973), birth name of Alix Strachey, American-born British psychoanalyst
Mary Sargant Florence (1857–1954), British figure painter
Philip Sargant Florence (1890–1982), American economist

See also
Sargent (name)